Neomyennis zebra is a species of ulidiid or picture-winged fly in the genus Neomyennis of the family Tephritidae.

References

Ulidiinae
Insects described in 1909